Tara Macken is an American stunt woman and actress.

Life and career

Early life
She was born in a car in Kuwait in 1990. Her father is Irish and her mother is Filipino.

2006-2012: Career beginnings
She has done stunt work on more than 20 films and television series, including Spy Kids: All the Time in the World in 4D as a stunt double for Alexa Vega, Nikita for Maggie Q, and G.I. Joe: Retaliation for Élodie Yung.

Macken has also been featured as an actress in the series Sons of Anarchy and Hawaii Five-O, among others. Additionally, she provided motion capture work for the 2012 video game Resident Evil: Operation Raccoon City.

Macken appeared in the 2012 film The Hunger Games as the District 4 tribute, and her stunt work was featured in Battleship and in Star Trek Into Darkness.

Filmography

References

External links

Stunt reel

Living people
American people of Irish descent
American actresses of Filipino descent
American stunt performers
Santa Clara University alumni
Actresses from Los Angeles
Place of birth missing (living people)
American film actresses
American television actresses
21st-century American women
1990 births